The molar mass constant, usually denoted by Mu, is a physical constant defined as one twelfth of the molar mass of carbon-12: Mu = M(12C)/12. The molar mass of any element or compound is its relative atomic mass (atomic weight) multiplied by the molar mass constant.

The mole and the relative atomic mass were originally defined in the International System of Units (SI) in such a way that the constant was exactly . That is, the numerical value of the molar mass of an element, in grams per mole of atoms, was equal to its atomic mass relative to the atomic mass constant, mu.

On 20 May 2019, the SI definition of mole changed in such a way that the molar mass constant is no longer exactly .  However, the difference is insignificant for all practical purposes.  According to the SI, the value of Mu now depends on the mass of one atom of carbon-12, which must be determined experimentally. As of that date, the 2018 CODATA recommended value of Mu is 

The molar mass constant is important in writing dimensionally correct equations. While one may informally say "the molar mass of an element M is the same as its atomic weight A", the atomic weight (relative atomic mass) A is a dimensionless quantity, whereas the molar mass M has the units of mass per mole.  Formally, M is A times the molar mass constant Mu.

Prior to 2019 redefinition 

The molar mass constant was unusual (but not unique) among physical constants by having an exactly defined value rather than being measured experimentally. From the old definition of the mole, the molar mass of carbon 12 was exactly 12 g/mol. From the definition of relative atomic mass, the relative atomic mass of carbon 12, that is the atomic weight of a sample of pure carbon 12, is exactly 12. The molar mass constant was thus given by

The molar mass constant is related to the mass of a carbon-12 atom in grams:

The Avogadro constant being a fixed value, the mass of a carbon-12 atom depends on the accuracy and precision of the molar mass constant.

(The speed of light is another example of a physical constant whose value is fixed by the definitions of the International System of Units (SI).)

Post-2019 redefinition

Because the 2019 redefinition of SI base units gave the Avogadro constant an exact numerical value, the value of the molar mass constant is no longer exact, and will be subject to increasing precision with future experimentations. 

One consequence of this change is that the previously defined relationship between the mass of the 12C atom, the dalton, the kilogram, and the Avogadro number is no longer valid. One of the following had to change:
 The mass of a 12C atom is exactly 12 daltons.
 The number of daltons in a gram is exactly equal to the numerical value of the Avogadro number: i.e. .

The wording of the 9th SI Brochure implies that the first statement remains valid, which means the second is no longer true.

See also 
Dalton

Notes

References 

Amount of substance
Physical constants